José G. Constanza (born September 1, 1983) is a Dominican former professional baseball outfielder. He played in Major League Baseball (MLB) for the Atlanta Braves.

Baseball career

Cleveland Indians
Constanza was signed as a non-drafted free agent by the Cleveland Indians on June 13, 2003. After two years and one 2004 League MVP in the Dominican Summer League, he came to America in 2005 with the Single-A Lake County Captains. After batting only .236 in 26 games, he was demoted to Short-Season Mahoning Valley. He started the 2006 season with Lake County and with a .395 On-base percentage, earned a promotion to A-Advanced Kinston. He spent 2007 with Kinston, and 2008, as well as 2009, with the Double-A Akron Aeros. In what proved to be his last season in the Indians organization, he reached the highest level, Triple-A, with the Columbus Clippers.

Atlanta Braves
On November 29, 2010, Constanza signed a minor league deal with the Atlanta Braves. He made spring training with the club, batting .222 before being assigned to Triple-A Gwinnett. He was batting .312 and was an All-Star before his first call-up.

On July 29, 2011, Constanza was called up to the majors when Nate McLouth was placed on the 15-day disabled list with a lower abdominal strain. Placed in the leadoff spot in the Braves' lineup in his debut game, he got his first career hit in the bottom of the eighth inning off Florida Marlins pitcher (and former Braves pitcher) Mike Dunn, an RBI single that extended the Braves' lead to 4–0. Two batters later, Braves first-baseman Freddie Freeman hit a sacrifice fly to drive in Constanza, netting him his first career run scored. On Sunday, August 7, 2011, Constanza hit his first home run in the top of the 5th inning against the New York Mets. He was subsequently recognized for his odd habit of licking the hot spot of the bat after foul-tipping the ball.

Constanza was called up once again on July 13, 2013 due to many injuries to the Braves' regular outfielders. Constanza was designated for assignment on January 28, 2015.

Cincinnati Reds
He was signed by Cincinnati to a minor league contract on May 10, 2015 and was released on July 16, 2015.

Tampa Bay Rays
Constanza signed a minor league deal with the Tampa Bay Rays on August 31, 2015.

Leones de Yucatán
Constanza signed with the Leones de Yucatán of the Mexican Baseball League on March 29, 2016. He was released on April 30, 2016.

Broncos de Reynosa
Constanza signed with the Broncos de Reynosa of the Mexican Baseball League on May 24, 2016. He was released on June 28, 2016.

York Revolution
Constanza signed with the York Revolution of the Atlantic League of Professional Baseball for the 2017 season. This marks his second stint with the team as he played with them in 2015. He was released on May 27, 2017.  In 25 games he slashed .235/.284/.255 with 0 home runs and 6 RBIs.

Minor League awards
 2× International League All-Star (2010, 2011)
 New York–Penn League All-Star (2005)
 DSL MVP (2004)

References

External links

1983 births
Living people
Águilas Cibaeñas players
Akron Aeros players
Atlanta Braves players
Azucareros del Este players
Broncos de Reynosa players
Columbus Clippers players
Dominican Republic expatriate baseball players in Mexico
Dominican Republic expatriate baseball players in the United States
Durham Bulls players
Gwinnett Braves players
Kinston Indians players
Lake County Captains players

Leones de Yucatán players
Louisville Bats players
Mahoning Valley Scrappers players
Major League Baseball outfielders
Major League Baseball players from the Dominican Republic
Mexican League baseball center fielders
Mexican League baseball left fielders
Sportspeople from Santo Domingo
Toros del Este players
York Revolution players